In Glendale is the second solo album by American comedian Tim Heidecker, released on May 20, 2016. The album is not a parody like his usual absurdist comedy and garnered some positive reviews.

Track listing

Personnel
Main personnel
 Tim Heidecker
 Jonathan Rado

References

2016 albums
Tim Heidecker albums
Folk rock albums by American artists
Self-released albums
Albums produced by Jonathan Rado